Kaijo Kuusing (born 15 June 1968) is an Estonian windsurfer. He competed in the men's Lechner A-390 event at the 1992 Summer Olympics.

References

External links
 
 

1968 births
Living people
Estonian windsurfers
Estonian male sailors (sport)
Olympic sailors of Estonia
Sailors at the 1992 Summer Olympics – Lechner A-390
Sportspeople from Viljandi